Con Tu Amor is the sixteenth studio album by Juan Gabriel, released in 1981.

Track listing

References

Sources

1981 albums